Kapri Lashaw Bibbs (born January 10, 1993) is a former American football running back. He played college football at Colorado State, and was signed by the Denver Broncos as an undrafted free agent in 2014. He has also played for the San Francisco 49ers, Washington Redskins, and Green Bay Packers.

Early years
Bibbs attended and played high school football at Plainfield North High School (IL) for the Tigers.

College career
Bibbs attended Snow College in 2011 and Front Range Community College in 2012. Before the 2013 season, he transferred to Colorado State. In his only season with the school, he rushed for a school record 1,741 yards and joined Barry Sanders and Montee Ball as the only players in NCAA history to rush for 30 touchdowns in a season. His 2013 season garnered him among the leaders in various rushing categories in the Mountain West Conference.

Bibbs entered the 2014 NFL Draft after his sophomore season.

Professional career

Denver Broncos
Bibbs was not selected in the 2014 NFL Draft, but was signed by the Denver Broncos as a free agent. He was signed to the team's practice squad for the 2014 season. He was released in November and tried out with the Arizona Cardinals, but he was ultimately re-signed to the Broncos' practice squad.

Bibbs was once again placed on the practice squad by the Broncos prior to the 2015 season. He was promoted to the active roster in October following an injury to Juwan Thompson. He was active for the game against the Cleveland Browns, but did not receive any carries. The day after the game, he was once again released; however, he was re-signed to the practice squad two days later.

On February 7, 2016, Bibbs was part of the Broncos team that won Super Bowl 50. In the game, the Broncos defeated the Carolina Panthers by a score of 24–10.

On November 6, 2016, on Sunday Night Football, Bibbs made a 69-yard catch and ran for his first career touchdown against their AFC West rival Oakland Raiders. He suffered a high ankle sprain in Week 13 and was placed on injured reserve on December 5, 2016. Overall, he finished the 2016 season with 129 rushing yards to go along with two receptions for 75 yards and a touchdown.

San Francisco 49ers
On April 29, 2017, the Broncos traded Bibbs and a 2017 fifth round draft pick to the San Francisco 49ers for a fourth round draft pick in 2018. He was waived on September 1, 2017.

Washington Redskins
On November 24, 2017, Bibbs was signed to the Washington Redskins' practice squad. He was promoted on the active roster on December 12, 2017. In his first game as a Redskin, he caught a screen pass from Kirk Cousins then scrambled for a 36-yard touchdown against the Arizona Cardinals. He finished the 2017 season with 79 rushing yards to go along with 14 receptions for 128 yards and a receiving touchdown.

On September 1, 2018, Bibbs was waived for final roster cuts before the start of the regular season, but signed to the team's practice squad the following day. He was promoted to the active roster on September 22, 2018. In Week 5, against the New Orleans Saints, he scored his first rushing touchdown as a Redskin. He was waived on December 15, 2018.

Green Bay Packers
On December 17, 2018, Bibbs was claimed off waivers by the Green Bay Packers following a knee injury suffered by Aaron Jones. He played in two games with the Packers to end the season. He finished the 2018 season with career totals of 103 rushing yards, three rushing touchdowns, 16 receptions, 115 receiving yards, and one receiving touchdown.

On June 14, 2019, Bibbs was released by the Packers. He was suspended one week by the NFL on November 8, 2019. He was reinstated from suspension on November 12.

NFL career statistics

See also
List of NCAA major college football yearly rushing leaders
List of NCAA major college football yearly scoring leaders

References

External links

Colorado State Rams bio
Washington Redskins bio

1993 births
Living people
African-American players of American football
American football running backs
Colorado State Rams football players
Denver Broncos players
Green Bay Packers players
People from Harvey, Illinois
Players of American football from Illinois
San Francisco 49ers players
Snow Badgers football players
Sportspeople from Cook County, Illinois
Washington Redskins players
21st-century African-American sportspeople